Oleh Horyslavets was born on 15 May 1983 in Kremenchuk, Ukraine) and is a Ukrainian football defender. He weighs .

Club history
He has played for FC Kremin Kremenchuk franchise since 1999. In 2004, he transferred to MFC Olexandria. In 2006, he came back to play for Kremin again.

External links
Official team website for FC Kremin Kremenchuk
FC Kremin Kremenchuk Squad

Living people
FC Kremin Kremenchuk players
MFC Olexandria players
Ukrainian footballers
1983 births
Association football defenders
People from Kremenchuk
Sportspeople from Poltava Oblast